Barahatal is a rural municipality located in Surkhet District of Karnali Province of Nepal.

Demographics
At the time of the 2011 Nepal census, Barahatal Rural Municipality had a population of 18,083. Of these, 87.6% spoke Nepali, 10.8% Magar, 1.0% Raji, 0.2% Gurung, 0.1% Maithili, 0.1% Newar and 0.2% other languages as their first language.

In terms of ethnicity/caste, 30.3% were Magar, 24.6% Chhetri, 22.5% Kami, 5.0% Damai/Dholi, 4.5% Hill Brahmin, 4.0% Thakuri, 2.9% Gurung, 2.2% Sanyasi/Dasnami, 1.2% Raji and 2.8% others.

In terms of religion, 84.2% were Hindu, 11.1% Buddhist, 4.4% Christian and 0.3% others.

References

External links
 Official website

Populated places in Surkhet District
Rural municipalities in Karnali Province
Rural municipalities of Nepal established in 2017